The Moles were an Australian indie pop band founded and led by Richard Davies.

History

The Moles were formed in Sydney and debuted in 1990 with the EP Untune the Sky.  In 1991 they released their second EP, Tendrils and Paracetamol. 1992 followed their first full-length album Untune the Sky, after which The Moles relocated to New York, where they released a pair of seven-inch singles (later packaged together as the Double Single EP).

After a move to London, The Moles broke up in 1993.

In 1994, Davies revived The Moles, which resulted in their second album Instinct.

Discography

Albums
 Untune the Sky (1992, Seaside Records)
 Instinct (1994, Flydaddy Records)
 Tonight's Music (2016, Fire Records (UK))

EPs
 Tendrils and Paracetamol (1991, Seaside Records)
 Double Single EP (1992, Seaside Records)

Singles
 Propeller (1990, Secret Family Records)
 Seaside Split with Brokenhead and Headache (1991, Seaside Records)

Compilations
 Flashbacks and Dream Sequences (2014, Fire Records (UK))

References

External links
 Short Biography at allmusic.com Retrieved 8 April 2013

Australian indie pop groups
New Zealand indie pop groups
Musical groups from Sydney
Musical groups disestablished in 1993
Musical groups reestablished in 1994
Musical groups disestablished in 1996